Lucius Papius Pacatianus or Pacatian was a vicarius of Roman Britain in 319. His holding the post is recorded in the Codex Theodosianus, although little else is known of him. He presided over a period of economic instability with coin hoards indicating high inflation, although several high status villas were rebuilt around this time and with Christian mosaics being built into them.

Sources
Todd, M Roman Britain, Fontana, London 1985
Salway, P Roman Britain, Oxford, 1986

Roman governors of Britain
4th-century Romans
Vicarii